Priya Sundareshan is an American attorney and politician who is a member of the Arizona Senate from the 18th district. She assumed office on January 9, 2023.

Education 
Sundareshan earned a Bachelor of Science degree in chemical engineering from the Massachusetts Institute of Technology (M.I.T.) in 2006. In 2011 Sundareshan earned both a Juris Doctor from the University of Arizona James E. Rogers College of Law, as well as Master of Science in natural resource economics also from the University of Arizona.

Career 
In addition to holding elected office, Sundareshan serves as the Director of Natural Resource Use and Management Clinic at the University of Arizona James E. Rogers College of Law. Previously, she worked as an attorney for the Environmental Defense Fund from 2015 to 2019, and additionally as an associate attorney at the law firm Pillsbury Winthrop Shaw Pittman in Washington, D.C. from 2012 to 2015. Sundareshan also worked as an analyst for PA Consulting Group in Cambridge, MA from 2006 to 2008.

2022 Arizona Senate election 
Due to the redistricting of Arizona legislative districts resulting from the 2020 census, the 18th legislative district was relocated from the Phoenix metropolitan area - where it had been represented by Arizona Senator Sean Bowie - to the Tucson metropolitan area, becoming an open seat. Sundareshan faced off against Arizona Legislator Morgan Abraham in the Democratic primary, defeating him 55.6% to 44.4%. Sundareshan defeated Republican former Department of Defense employee Stan Caine in the general election.

Electoral history

References 

21st-century American politicians
Politicians from Tucson, Arizona
Living people
Democratic Party Arizona state senators
Arizona lawyers
Massachusetts Institute of Technology alumni
University of Arizona alumni
James E. Rogers College of Law alumni
University of Arizona faculty
1980s births
21st-century American women politicians
21st-century American women lawyers
21st-century American lawyers